The Mead substation is a major electric power interconnection point in the western United States. The station is located in the El Dorado Valley of Nevada just outside of Boulder City, at the end of Buchanan Boulevard south of its grade separation with Interstate 11. The facility is owned and operated by the Western Area Power Administration.

Interconnects
 2× 230 kV Amargosa substation (WAPA) to Henderson
 230kV Camino substation East line (Metropolitan Water District) Path 58
 230kV Camino substation West line (Metropolitan Water District)
 230kV Eldorado substation line 1
 230kV Eldorado substation line 2
 2× 230 kV McCullough substation (LADWP)
 230kV Newport substation line 1 (Colorado River Commission) serving the Southern Nevada Water Authority pumping station
 230kV Newport substation line 2 (Colorado River Commission)
 230 kV etcetera
 287kV Victorville Path 46
 345kV to Liberty substation near Phoenix, Arizona
 500kv Harry Allen Generating Station Substation
 500kV Marketplace substation
 500kV Perkins substation

Power plants
 230kV Hoover No. 5, 
 230kV Hoover No. 6,  
 230kV Hoover No. 7, 
 230kV Hoover No. 8,

Heliport 

Notes 

Buildings and structures in Clark County, Nevada
Western Interconnection
Energy infrastructure in Nevada